Vladislav Hercegović (1426 or 1427 – 1489) was oldest son of Stjepan Vukčić. The Kosača noble family held lands in the region of Herzegovina. Vladislav received his father's land and the title of herzog. During his father's reign he is known to have interfered with his affairs. After 1453 he was frequently in the service of the Ottoman Empire, the Republic of Venice and the Hungarian-Croatian king Matthias Corvinus. Corvinus granted him the forts of Veliki Kalnik and Mali Kalnik near Križevci.

As an Ottoman vassal (after 1469) he took part in the capture of the town of Počitelj on the river Neretva in 1472 and in battles against the Vlatković's of that region. He succeeded in escaping Ottoman rule until 1480 when he was defeated and retreated to Herceg Novi. When Herceg Novi was captured by the Ottomans in the year 1482, Vladislav retreated to the island of Rab under Venetian rule where he would die.

He married Anna Kantakouzene, one of the five known daughters of George Palaiologos Kantakouzenos, in 1453 or 1454. A surviving letter from King Alfonso of Naples and Aragon to Vladislav's father Stjepan dated 5 April 1455 congratulates the latter that two of his sons are married: one to the niece of the Despot of Serbia (who would be Anna Kantakouzene), and the other to the sister of the Count of Cilly. At some time after this Vladislav sent Anna with his son Balša and niece Mara to live in the Republic of Ragusa (modern Dubrovnik).

His brother was Stjepan Hercegović, who converted to Islam in 1470, became known as Hersekzade Ahmed Pasha, and became a five-time grand vizier of the Ottoman Empire.

His son, Balša, was the titular "Duke of St. Sava" (dux sancti Save).

Descendants
Balša
Petar
Matija
Miklos
Ivan
Andrija
Tomaš
Unknown Daughter
Unknown Daughter
Vladislav Hercegović

References 

1426 births
1489 deaths
Hercegović noble family
Grand Dukes of Bosnia